Sheryl Halle Lipman (born February 18, 1963) is the Chief United States district judge of the United States District Court for the Western District of Tennessee and a former university counsel for the University of Memphis.

Biography

Lipman received a Bachelor of Arts degree in 1984 from the University of Michigan. She received a Juris Doctor in 1987 from the New York University School of Law. She served as a law clerk to Judge Julia S. Gibbons of the United States District Court for the Western District of Tennessee from 1987 to 1988. From 1988 to 1991, she worked at the law firm of Reed Smith, focusing on white-collar criminal defense work. From 1991 to 1995, she worked at Wyatt, Tarrant & Combs LLP, focusing on civil litigation. From 1996 to 1997, she served as vice president of comprehensive services at the Memphis Race Relations & Diversity Institute. She worked at Burch, Porter & Johnson, PLLC, practicing civil litigation from 1997 to 1999. From 1999 until 2014 she worked at the University of Memphis, joining in 1999 as a senior attorney and becoming university counsel in 2002. In the latter capacity, she was responsible for the legal interests of the university by serving as the primary in-house counsel on all major litigation and providing regulatory advice on a wide variety of issues.

Federal judicial service

On August 1, 2013, President Barack Obama nominated Lipman to serve as a judge on the United States District Court for the Western District of Tennessee. Lipman would fill the seat of Judge Jon Phipps McCalla, who assumed senior status on August 23, 2013. On January 16, 2014, Lipman's nomination was reported out of a U.S. Senate committee. On April 11, 2014, Senate Majority Leader Reid filed a motion to invoke cloture on the nomination. On April 29, 2014, cloture was invoked by a 58–39 vote. On April 30, 2014, the nomination was confirmed by a 95–0 vote. Lipman received her judicial commission on May 1, 2014, and took the oath of office on August 15, 2014. She became chief judge on January 20, 2023.

See also
List of Jewish American jurists

References

External links

1963 births
Living people
Judges of the United States District Court for the Western District of Tennessee
New York University School of Law alumni
Tennessee lawyers
United States district court judges appointed by Barack Obama
University of Michigan alumni
21st-century American judges